The highest-selling albums and mini-albums in Japan are ranked in the Oricon Weekly Chart, which is published by Oricon Style magazine. The data are compiled by Oricon based on each album's weekly physical sales. In 2006, 42 albums reached the peak of the charts.

Chart history

References

Japan Oricon Albums
Lists of number-one albums in Japan
2006 in Japanese music